William Philip Minicozzi II is an American mathematician. He was born in Bryn Mawr, Pennsylvania, in 1967.

Career
Minicozzi graduated from Princeton University in 1990 and received his Ph.D. from Stanford University in 1994 under the direction of Richard Schoen. After graduating he spent a year at the Courant Institute of New York University as a visiting member where he began working with Tobias Colding on harmonic functions on Riemannian manifolds,
work he was later invited to present at the Geometry Festival. In 1995, he went to the Johns Hopkins University,
with a National Science Foundation postdoctoral fellowship.

Minicozzi became the J. J. Sylvester Professor of Mathematics at Johns Hopkins in 2002, and later became Krieger-Eisenhower Professor there.  He turned to work on minimal surfaces, continuing to work with Tobias Colding. In 2012 he joined MIT as a professor of mathematics. Currently, they mainly work on the mean curvature flow.

In addition to his teaching and research duties, Minicozzi serves as an editor of the American Journal of Mathematics.

Awards and honors
He won a Sloan Fellowship in 1998.
He gave an invited address on this work at the 2006 ICM in Madrid, a London Mathematical Society Spitalfields Lecture in 2007, the thirty-fifth University of Arkansas Spring Lecture Series in 2010, and an AMS invited address in Syracuse in 2010.

In 2010 William P. Minicozzi received the Oswald Veblen Prize in Geometry together with Tobias Colding for their work on minimal surfaces. In justification of the reward the American Mathematical Society wrote:

In 2012 he became a fellow of the American Mathematical Society.

Selected publications

References

External links

Johns Hopkins University faculty
Stanford University alumni
20th-century American mathematicians
21st-century American mathematicians
Differential geometers
Living people
1967 births
Fellows of the American Mathematical Society
Mathematicians from Pennsylvania
People from Bryn Mawr, Pennsylvania